Grigore Singurel (born Yefim Krimerman in 1923 - 2015) was a Bessarabian journalist.

Biography 

Grigore Singurel (Yefim Krimerman) was born in Bălţi, in 1923. He graduated from the Philological Faculty of Moldova State University. Singurel worked as a lecturer and musicologist of the Moldavan State Philharmonic Society. In 1980 he moved to Israel, but soon moved to Munich, where he worked for Radio Free Europe.

Works 
 Grigore Singurel, Moldavia on the Barricades of Perestroika, 1989

Lyrics for songs
 De ce plâng chitarele? (1969)
 Cântă un artist (1969) 
 Pe strada însorită (1969) (composer Arkady Luxemburg)
 Fără tine (1969) (composer Arkady Luxemburg)

Bibliography 
 Sovetskaya Moldavia, Chişinău, "The 'Knight' of the Lie and Slander" in Russian language, 4 September 1984, p. 3.

Notes

External links 
 USSR Report POLITICAL AND SOCIOLOGICAL AFFAIRS

1923 births
Bessarabian Jews
Moldovan Jews
Moldovan journalists
Male journalists
Moldovan anti-communists
Moldova State University alumni
Radio Free Europe/Radio Liberty people
2015 deaths
Soviet emigrants to Israel